Fabian Cortez is a mutant supervillain appearing in American comic books published by Marvel Comics, commonly as an enemy of the X-Men. Created by writer Chris Claremont and writer/illustrator Jim Lee, he first appeared in X-Men #1 (October 1991).

Fictional character biography

Acolytes
Thought to be royalty from Spain, Fabian Cortez organizes the original Acolytes, who pledge themselves to Magneto and his cause. Cortez then goads and manipulates Magneto into combat with humanity and the X-Men at every turn, leading to the destruction of Magneto's space-station, Asteroid M, and the deaths of the other Acolytes, including Cortez's own sister Anne Marie.

Cortez recruits a group of Acolytes who, believing Magneto to be dead and martyred for his cause, now worship him as their god, to follow Cortez in Magneto's name.<ref>The Uncanny X-Men 300</ref> They launch several strikes on humanity, ranging from attacks on a military base where new Sentinels are being built, to slaughtering helpless humans in a hospital. Magneto eventually resurfaces, sending his chosen heir Exodus to inform the Acolytes of Cortez's betrayal. The Acolytes welcome Exodus as their new leader, and Cortez is left behind.

Bloodties
Fearing Magneto's wrath, Cortez flees to Genosha. Still claiming to speak in Magneto's name, he incites the nation's mutant population into starting a civil war against the humans, the world's first instance of the long-threatened genetic war between man and mutant. With the aid of the mutates, Cortez kidnaps Magneto's granddaughter Luna, intending to use her as a shield to protect himself from Magneto, the X-Men, and the Avengers. Cortez is unaware that Magneto had recently been mindwiped by Charles Xavier; and Exodus comes to Genosha in his place, seemingly killing Cortez.

Back with the Acolytes
Cortez reappears months later, claiming to have been badly injured, yet not actually killed, despite all appearances. He manipulates Joseph into posing as Magneto, pitting him against Exodus in an attempt to regain control of the Acolytes. Despite his scheme's failure, he is allowed to return to the team. Months later, after Exodus was briefly imprisoned, the Acolytes split into two groups, each searching for Magneto. Cortez leads one group, but they abandon him during a battle with the X-Men, upon realising how he has been using them for his own purposes.

Dark Seduction
Alone again, Cortez is surprised to be recruited by Magneto himself, to whom the United Nations has given control of Genosha. Seeing as how Cortez had betrayed him earlier, Magneto only lets Fabian Cortez serve him on Genosha because his own powers have been reduced and Cortez's mutant power is needed to heighten the abilities of the other mutants. After a further betrayal by Cortez, discovered by Magneto's UN advisor Alda Huxley to be the leader of the Genoshen cabinet assisting a rebellion in Carrion Cove, Magneto is restored to full power by one of the Genengineer's machines and, as he no longer needs Cortez, moves him from a prison in Hammer Bay, to over fifty miles away to Carrion Cove in less than 20 seconds. The impact kills Cortez instantly, as he is splattered on the ground at Magneto's feet. Just before his death, a connection between Cortez and the geneticist Mister Sinister was implied, which would explain how Cortez returned alive and well when everyone believed him dead at the hands of Exodus.

Necrosha
After the X-Men form Utopia, Magneto joins them, saying he supports their efforts. Selene especially wants Magneto captured for his collaboration with Emma Frost to overthrow her from her position as Black Queen of the Hellfire Club. She has three of her recently resurrected mind-controlled soldiers—Acolytes Cortez, Delgado, and Mellencamp—hunt down Magneto. They try to torture Loa to get the information out of her, but when she tries to hide in her room she finds Deadpool inside it. Deadpool battles the trio, but the techno-organic virus that is inside the Acolytes (which caused their resurrection) prevent him from killing them. At one point in the battle, Cortez grabs Loa by the throat and demands to know Magneto's location, saying that even though Selene wants Magneto alive he will fight the mind-control and kill him anyway. Loa begs Cortez not to make her hurt him, something Cortez does not believe possible. Deadpool knocks Loa out of Cortez's hands, but then is overpowered by the Acolytes. Loa uses her matter disruption powers to slide through Mellencamp, mutilating him. Deadpool, seeing that Loa's powers were able to slay Selene's minions, forces her to kill Cortez and Delgado by throwing her into them (to survive, she has to slide through them, which causes them to crumble). Deadpool then tells Cyclops that he should not be in trouble because Loa had done all the killing.

The techno-organic virus however appears to reform Cortez, as he resurfaced later along with fellow Upstarts members Shinobi Shaw, Siena Blaze, and Trevor Fitzroy, and started the game that they created long ago. They kill members of the Nasty Boys to lure out Cyclops and his ragtag team of X-Men to Washington Heights. After a brief exchange of words, the two groups engage each other in battle. The X-Men gain the upper hand as the Upstarts retreat; but Shinobi is left behind, only to kill himself as he does not want to be captured or controlled by the Hellfire Club.

Krakoa
Cortez later appeared as a member of The Six, a mutant sub-team under the command of S.W.O.R.D. and its commander Abigail Brand He was the "head" of the mutant power amplification and unification, under the guise of The Power. During the attack of Knull on Krakoa, he joins his S.W.O.R.D teammates to defend Krakoa as he gained access to the island by possessing Kid Cable. As he saw a critically injured Sunfire, he healed him and greatly enhanced his powers, only for Knull to kill them both for their transgressions against him.

He was later revived with the help of Jean Grey, nude and confused as he remembered he requested a meeting with Magneto and the Quiet Council (with Brand and Peepers sitting in). After he discussed his views on the law against murdering Flatscans being a waste of not showing mutant superiority, he soon came to realize through their comments and questions that they were just humouring him and didn't take him seriously. Lashing out, he mentioned how vital he was to S.W.O.R.D and how he should be treated better, only for Amelia Voght and Khora of the Burning Heart to teleport in and announce Khora as his replacement.

After this humiliation he fell into depression and began drinking at The Green Lagoon and frequenting Stacy X's brothel, but everywhere he went just furthered his humiliation. Doctor Nemesis used this depression as an opportunity to test pharmaceuticals on him. At one point after being thrown out of Stacy X's brothel, he got in a fight with Lost who heard him announce he was the leader of The Acolytes, as witnessed by Nightcrawler.

Still hoping to find a way to kill humans without getting into trouble, he took Gorgon who'd been brain-damaged after coming back from dying in Otherworld, to Central Park and amplified his telepathy so he could hear every negative and hateful thing the people around him were thinking. He almost succeeded in getting Gorgon to kill everybody there but when Nightcrawler teleported into an ice-cream stand trying to stop them, everyone started laughing calming the confused Gorgon down. He started serving the humans ice-cream much to Fabian's dismay. Fabian begged Nightcrawler not to report this to The Quiet Council but instead Kurt dragged him to Planet Arakko and forced him to confront one of his former victims, Lost who's parents were killed in one of the Acolytes attacks.

Instead of talking it out as Kurt had hoped, the two continually tried to kill each other. Realizing he wasn't getting through to them, he teleported them both into the sky and let them fall to their potential deaths. He told Fabian if he made an attempt to apologize to Lost she could use her gravity manipulation to ensure they all land safely, but if not he'll block her powers so all three will die. Fabian tried to sincerely apologize to her and admitted there was something wrong with him but he was abruptly possessed by Onslaught and made to overload her with his power, burning her out. When he came too he was horrified by what had happened and told Kurt it wasn't his fault. He realized they were still falling and now as a result of Lost's power overload, the moon Phobos had fallen out of orbit and was about to crush the planet. When Kurt stopped their descent, Fabian begged him to teleport them to safety but he refused to leave without protecting the people still on the planet. He told Fabian to overload him with power as he did to Lost, so  he could put Phobos back into orbit with his last dying breath. Fabian broke down and in a shocking moment of humility, confessed that he believed he'd fail and that all he really wanted was for people to like and respect him, Kurt asked him how he expected people to like him when he clearly despised himself. Overcoming his cowardice and selfishness, he helped Nightcrawler save the planet. Kurt then gave him the task of helping him restore his memories after his resurrection so he could remember how to stop Onslaught. Unfortunately at that moment Onslaught, possessing Xavier, appeared behind him and but him into a coma. Xavier showed the revived Kurt his comatose body and told him he was denying him death and resurrection, so he could never restore Kurt's memories or earn redemption.

Fortunately Kurt figured out something was going on and had Legion bring Fabian's mind to the Astral Plane. After Nightcrawler and his team discussed Onslaughts plan and realized he had spread to everyone on the Island, after Orchis had somehow planted a fragment him deep inside Lost's mind using her hatred of Fabian as a hiding place. He was now going to make every mutant kill themselves while Xavier deleted all their backups so they couldn't be resurrected. After Fabian explained to them why he became a terrorist and confessed his deep-seated self loathing Lost was able to remove Onslaught from her mind by letting go of her hatred for him. Onslaught now no longer in control of the mutants of Krakoa, took over Magneto and Xavier to create a physical form, but Onslaught was defeated by Dust who attacked him with the consciousness of every mutant in Legion's House of L infused into the individual grains of an Arakki sandstorm. Two months later Fabian and Lost were seen teaching Krakoan children Nightcrawler's philosophy of "The Spark" and later joined his team "The Legionarries" to protect Krakoa's laws and The Spark.

Powers and abilities
Fabian Cortez possesses a unique mutation that grants him the ability to enhance or diminish energy levels. In the case of mutants, he can enhance their abilities occasionally to very dangerous levels and limits that may exceed the normal limits of the targets' control; temporarily empowering them at the expense of their health. Thus, burning out the targeted subjects physical bodies, sometimes at the molecular level. 

In X-Men #1 (1991), while on board Asteroid M, Magneto returns from a fight with the X-Men, having suffered deep lacerations to his lower abdomen from Wolverine's claws. Cortez seemingly "heals" Magneto, as he says he had also done with his sister after an earlier battle. These actions temporarily restore Magneto back to full health and vitality. However, these actions turn out to be false, as the effects on Magneto were frequently needed to sustain the "healing" effects by Cortez. Whether this was an offshoot of Cortez's main powers, a display of "controlled power boosting", or demonstrations of an ability to "trigger" a mutant's own natural healing abilities is not known. This ability was not used much or at all in his later history. Additionally, it has not been determined if his power affects human bio-energy or other naturally occurring energy in the same manner.

Cortez could also use his powers to sense and interpret the genetic code of living beings and the unique bio-energy signatures and energy fields in other mutants. Likewise, he may also have some control over his own energy field along with possibly being able to constrict it around various targets and foes.

Cortez is also a skilled martial artist and often carries a firearm. It has not been yet determined if his skill sets are rooted in a previous military background, resulting in advanced tactical expertise. Still, it is noteworthy to mention that he is highly intelligent and a formidable military tactician and strategist.

Development
Cortez was created toward the very end of Claremont's tenure writing the X-Men and was the last major character he introduced.  There is a "widespread but unconfirmed rumor that Fabian Cortez was named as a slight to writer Fabian Nicieza" in the Marvel fandom, as Claremont was known to have tensions with Nicieza at the time.

Other versions

Marvel Zombies
In the Marvel Zombies reality, Magneto heads to earth to rescue anyone he can from the zombie plague. Cortez is entrusted with overseeing Asteroid M and preparing it to be the last outpost of humanoid life. Cortez does this well; his group soon joins up with other survivors, including Forge and the Black Panther. Magneto perishes in battle against the zombies. Decades later, in Marvel Zombies 2, Cortez's child regains control of the colony during a battle with cosmically powered zombies.

X-Men Forever

In this reality, which takes place shortly after the X-Men escape the destruction of Asteroid M, Nick Fury enlists the X-Men in helping him find and capture Cortez. The X-Men successfully capture Cortez, although he nearly defeats them single-handedly. Cortez is eventually turned over to S.H.I.E.L.D., but corrupt agents within then give him over the anti-mutant Consortium. Eager to exploit the "burnout" (that reality's phenomenon where mutant powers cause people to physically give out and die prematurely), the Consortium thought Cortez's powers were rife with the potential to weaponize the concept. Weeks later, Cortez is rescued by Nick Fury and the X-Men, but is on the verge of death due to the experimentation he was forced to endure. Cortez dies in the custody of the X-Men shortly thereafter.

X-Men '92
Cortez appears in X-Men '92, when he overcharges Lila Cheney's teleporting powers; and she takes the X-Men to a distant planet inhabited by the mutant Brood.

What If
Cortez appears in a number of What If...? issues.
In the reality seen where Tony Stark chooses not to begin a super-hero career as Iron Man after returning from captivity. Cortez and the Acolytes assemble under Magneto and battle both the X-Men and the StarkTech Sentinels that threaten mutant lives after Tony Stark's innovations to America's Sentinel program pushes the mutant race to the brink of extinction.

In the reality where the space station Avalon was officially recognized as a mutant colony under the rule of Magneto, divisions between his Acolytes erupt, with Exodus leading the isolationists, who want to take Avalon to the stars and away from the taint of humanity on Earth, while Cortez's annihilationists wish to return to Earth, eliminate the humans, and reclaim their homeland. These concerns become secondary after the birth of Acolytes Skids and Rusty's first child, who registers as Homo Ultima, the next stage of humanity, beyond even that of mutant. Cortez and Exodus unite their factions for fear of being usurped, leading to the death of the child. In the aftermath, it is revealed that Magneto engineered fake genetic scan results for Homo Ultima, sacrificing the child to bring unity to his Acolytes.

In other media

Television
 Fabian Cortez appears in X-Men: The Animated Series, voiced by Jeffrey Max Nicholls. As in the comics storyline, Cortez is the leader of the Acolytes and uses his powers to bolster Magneto's own abilities. However, Cortez's extreme anti-human sentiments lead him to betray Magneto and try to kill him, framing Professor X, Beast, and Gambit, capturing and torturing the latter. Cortez threatens to destroy Earth but is stopped by the X-Men and Amelia Voght, who reveals Cortez's betrayal to the other Acolytes and the entire mutant population of Asteroid M. He is trapped on Asteroid M by a vengeful Magneto, but is rescued from its destruction by Apocalypse and Deathbird. Apocalypse grants him the ability to alter the mutations of other mutants. Cortez then appears in the final-season episode "The Fifth Horseman", now turned into a servant and worshipper of his savior. Cortez assembles a cult worshipping Apocalypse, as well as the Hounds, a foursome of altered mutants, in an attempt to find a new body for Apocalypse (who was defeated and left bodyless in "Beyond Good and Evil"). Cortez captures Jubilee and turns Beast into a feral monster, but is stopped by Caliban (who was one of the Hounds). After being defeated, Cortez begs Apocalypse's forgiveness for his failure. However, Apocalypse is not angry, stating that Cortez has succeeded in providing him with a new vessel. When Cortez asks what he means, Apocalypse takes possession of Cortez's body.

Video games
 Fabian Cortez is a boss in X-Men: Gamesmaster's Legacy. Defeating him releases Bishop.
 Cortez also appears in X-Men 2: Clone Wars'' for Sega Genesis, as a boss during stage 3, before Magneto is recruited as a playable character. He flies around the level on a jetpack, finally busting through the window at the end of the stage.

References

External links
 Fabian Cortez at Marvel.com

Comics characters introduced in 1991
Marvel Comics supervillains
Marvel Comics male supervillains
Marvel Comics martial artists
Marvel Comics mutants
Fictional cult leaders
Fictional murderers
Characters created by Chris Claremont
Characters created by Jim Lee